General elections were held in Ghana on 18 June 1979, with a second round of the presidential election on 9 July 1979. The presidential election resulted in victory for Hilla Limann of the People's National Party, who received 62% of the votes in the run-off, whilst his PNP won 71 of the 140 seats in Parliament. According to one scholar, the elections were conducted "in as free and fair a manner as might be considered humanly possible under local conditions" and the losing candidates publicly accepted defeat. Around 5,070,000 people were registered to vote.

The Electoral Commissioner during the elections was Joseph Kingsley-Nyinah, an Appeal Court Judge who was appointed by the Supreme Military Council (SMC). Although the SMC was overthrown on 4 June 1979, the Armed Forces Revolutionary Council military government which replaced it allowed the elections to proceed just two weeks later.

Results

President

Parliament

Seats won by region

See also
List of MPs elected in the 1979 Ghanaian parliamentary election

References

Elections in Ghana
1979 in Ghana
Ghana
Presidential elections in Ghana
Election and referendum articles with incomplete results